Raven Gargoyle is an outdoor 1987 sculpture by Wayne Chabre, installed in 1988 on the University of Oregon campus in Eugene, Oregon, in the United States. The hammered copper head of a raven with a Kwakiutl Indian mask, built on a stainless steel frame, measures approximately  x  x . It was surveyed and deemed "treatment needed" by the Smithsonian Institution's "Save Outdoor Sculpture!" program in March 1993. The sculpture is administered by the University of Oregon.

See also

 1987 in art
 Cultural depictions of ravens
 Raven Tales

References

1987 sculptures
1988 establishments in Oregon
Sculptures of birds in Oregon
Copper sculptures in Oregon
Outdoor sculptures in Eugene, Oregon
Ravens
Sculptures by Wayne Chabre
Stainless steel sculptures in Oregon
University of Oregon campus